Komsomolsky District may refer to:
Komsomolsky District, Russia, name of several districts in Russia
Komsomolskyi Raion, a city district of Kherson, Ukraine

See also
 Komsomolsky (disambiguation)

District name disambiguation pages